Plutarco Castellanos (born 8 July 1971) is a Honduran swimmer. He competed at the 1988 Summer Olympics and the 1992 Summer Olympics.

References

1971 births
Living people
Honduran male swimmers
Olympic swimmers of Honduras
Swimmers at the 1988 Summer Olympics
Swimmers at the 1992 Summer Olympics
Place of birth missing (living people)
20th-century Honduran people
21st-century Honduran people